Jamaica–Spain relations refers to the current and historical relationship between Jamaica and Spain.

Both countries highlight a degree of cooperation and friendship in cultural and commercial relations, expressing their commitment to favor the strengthening of ties between the Caribbean Community (CARICOM) and the Ibero-American General Secretariat (SEGIB).

Resident diplomatic missions
 Jamaica is accredited to Spain from its embassy in Brussels, Belgium.
 Spain has an embassy in Kingston.

See also 
 Foreign relations of Jamaica 
 Foreign relations of Spain

References

 
Spain
Bilateral relations of Spain
Relations of colonizer and former colony